Etisus is a genus of crabs, containing the following extant species:

Etisus albus (Ward, 1934)
Etisus anaglyptus H. Milne-Edwards, 1834
Etisus armatus (Ward, 1942)
Etisus australis (Ward, 1936)
Etisus bargibanti Crosnier, 1987
Etisus bifrontalis (Edmondson, 1935)
Etisus bulejiensis Tirmizi & Ghani, 1988
Etisus demani Odhner, 1925
Etisus dentatus (Herbst, 1785)
Etisus electra (Herbst, 1801)
Etisus frontalis (Dana, 1852)
Etisus godeffroyi (A. Milne-Edwards, 1873)
Etisus laboutei Crosnier, 1987
Etisus laevimanus Randall, 1840
Etisus maculatus (Stimpson, 1860)
Etisus odhneri Takeda, 1971
Etisus paulsoni (Klunzinger, 1913)
Etisus punctatus Hombron & Jacquinot, 1846
Etisus rhynchophorus A. Milne-Edwards, 1873
Etisus sakaii Takeda & Miyaki, 1968
Etisus splendidus Rathbun, 1906
Etisus utilis Jacquinot in Jacquinot & Lucas, 1853
Etisus villosus Clark & Galil, 1995
Etisus zehntneri Serène, 1980

References

Xanthoidea
Taxa named by Henri Milne-Edwards
Decapod genera